The Hunter is the first EP (and follow up to the 2010 solo album The Boxer) by Kele Okereke (under the professional name Kele), lead singer and rhythm guitarist of the British rock band Bloc Party. It was released on 7 November 2011 by Wichita Recordings in the UK, set back a week from the original release date, and 3 days earlier on 4 November 2011 by Wichita Recordings and Liberator Music in Australia. The first single released from the EP was "What Did I Do?", which features guest vocals from Lucy Taylor. The music video was released on 13 September 2011, with the song released as a digital single in Japan 10 days later.

Background
The EP was announced about 2 weeks after Bloc Party met up in New York City to begin the writing process for their fourth studio album.

The EP's first single was "What Did I Do?", which features vocals from singer Lucy Taylor. The music video was released on 13 September 2011, with the song released as a digital single in Japan 10 days later. A remix of the single by All The Lights was released as a single by Liberator Music to the Australian iTunes Store on 16 November 2011.

The EP featured production from XXXChange (who was responsible for the production on Kele's first solo release, The Boxer), RAC, Fred Falke and QNESS, with Sub Focus also mixing the lead single. The EP also sees Kele doing production work for the first time, producing the track "Cable's Goodbye".

It contains six original songs, as well as a cover of Q Lazzarus' song "Goodbye Horses". Speaking to This Is Fake DIY, Kele said, about the cover of "Goodbye Horses":

Musical style 
The musical style of the EP differs from Kele's first solo effort, The Boxer, in that it explores into adding dubstep basslines, synthpop elements and dancehall tones to songs, while still keeping some of the experimental elements of The Boxer'''s production.

 Coverage 
Despite the EP's lead single "What Did I Do?" being publicised by many major magazines online, the EP itself was not widely reviewed. At the time of release a statement from Bloc Party's guitarist, Russell Lissack, was circulating in the press suggesting that Kele was no longer a part of the band and that they were planning to audition new singers. The band later indicated that this was not the case, as did Okereke when he posted pictures of him working with the other Bloc Party band members on his own website.

 Critical reception 

Drowned in Sound were rather critical of the album, stating that the track 'Release Me' "is irredeemably poor, a beige-by-numbers of bland synth stabs and trite lyrics that somehow manages to be both incredibly dull and, like the EP’s cover, unintentionally hilarious". However, they were also more positive with mixed comments regarding the song "Love as a Weapon", calling it "the clear standout" of the EP, noting that it "builds from glitches and light percussion into a mesh of samples and piano arpeggios and hummed melodies lifted straight from 'The Prayer'".

This Is Fake DIY gave the EP a score of 7/10, criticising the tone of Kele's lyrics, stating that The Hunter "sees Kele complete his journey from indie rock miserabalist to dubstep, floorfilling… miserabilist", and the EP's title, saying that "after the release of The Boxer, Kele continues his attempt to lay claim to all traditionally masculine roles with The Hunter", they jokingly added that "contenders for his next album title could be The Brickie or The Mechanic". The generally favourable review did however praise the EP in other areas, stating that "for the most part, this is an EP of arms aloft, triumphant club bangers - of someone comfortable with their voice and with their sound".

The Independent commented that main producer XXXChange "brings a bracing electro sensibility to proceedings". They also recommended the songs "Release Me", "Devotion" and "Cable's Goodbye".

 Commercial performance 
Commercially, the EP performed poorly, charting only in Australia with a peak of 79 on the Australian Albums Chart, and a peak of number 27 on the Australian Digital Albums Chart.

The lead single, "What Did I Do?", also only achieved a chart position in Australia, reaching a peak of 82 on the ARIA Digital Track Chart and 18 on the Australian Dance Chart.

 Track listing 

 Personnel 
Credits adapted from The Hunter'' CD booklet.

 Kele Okereke - lead vocals (tracks 2-7), backing vocals (track 1), production (track 5), songwriting (all tracks except 4)

Additional musicians 
 Lucy Taylor - lead vocals (track 1), backing vocals (tracks 4 and 5), flute (track 5)
 William Garvey - songwriting (track 4)
 Dan Smith - slide guitar (track 6)
 Jack Tarrant - additional guitar (track 6)
 Jodie Scantlebury - backing vocals (track 7)
 Bobbie Gordon - backing vocals (track 7)

Production and mixing 
 XXXChange - production (tracks 1, 3, 6 and 7), mixing (tracks 3, 6 and 7)
 Sub Focus - mixing (track 1)
 RAC - production (track 2)
 QNESS - additional production and mixing (track 2)
 Daniel Lindegren - production (track 4)
 Fred Falke - additional production and mixing (track 4)
 Ben Jackson - mixing (track 5), recording (all tracks)
 Scott McCormick - recording (all tracks)
 Guy Davie - mastering (at Electric Mastering)

Artwork 
 Cathal O'Brien - photography
 Rob Crane - design

Publishing 
 Wichita Recordings - publishing
 Liberator Music - publishing (in Australia, with Wichita Recordings)
 PIAS Entertainment Group - manufacturing and distribution
 EMI/Kobalt Music - song publishing (all tracks except 4)
 Sony/ATV - song publishing (track 4)

Management 
 Tony Perrin - management
 Simon White - management

Release history

Chart performance

Album

Singles

References

External links
 Kele's official website

2011 debut EPs
Dubstep EPs
Wichita Recordings EPs
Kele Okereke EPs
Synth-pop EPs
Albums produced by XXXChange
Albums produced by Fred Falke